The Stu Hart's 88th Birthday Celebration (also called Stampede Wrestling 50th Anniversary Show) was a professional wrestling supercard produced by the Stampede Wrestling promotion that took place on May 2, 2003, at the Ogden Legion Hall in Calgary, Alberta. It was initially to be held at the Victoria Pavilion, however, the event was later moved to another venue. The show was held to celebrate Stu Hart's 88th birthday as well as the 50th anniversary of Stampede Wrestling. Ralph Klein, then Premier of Alberta, made a guest appearance at the event to honor the Hart wrestling family. It was second reunion show to be held since the Stu Hart 50th Anniversary Show in 1995. The event featured talent from both the original Stampede Wrestling and Ross and Bruce Hart's version. Seven professional wrestling matches were featured on the card.

Event
Two of the matches on the undercard were Sabu versus Teddy Hart in a hardcore match, and Bruce Hart versus Principal Richard Pound. Another featured match was a standard wrestling match between Nattie Neidhart and Belle Lovitz. The main event was a tag team match between The Stampede Bulldogs (Harry Smith and T.J. Wilson) and the team of A.J. Styles and The Black Dragon. Wilson later claimed that their match was a great learning experience for him especially as he was preparing to enter New Japan Pro-Wrestling's Best of the Super Juniors that summer.

Results

Reception
The professional wrestling section, SLAM! Wrestling, of the Canadian Online Explorer website rated the entire event a 10 out of 10 stars.

See also
Professional wrestling in Canada

References

External links
Stu Hart's 88th Birthday Celebration at Cagematch.net
Stu Hart's 88th Birthday Celebration at Wrestlingdata.com

Stampede Wrestling
2003 in professional wrestling
Events in Calgary
Professional wrestling in Alberta
2003 in Alberta
Stu Hart